KQXY-FM (94.1 FM, "Q94") is a radio station broadcasting a Top 40 (CHR) format.  Licensed to Beaumont, Texas, it serves the Beaumont/Port Arthur metropolitan area.  It first began broadcasting under the call sign KLVI-FM in 1967.  The station is currently owned by Cumulus Media.  Its studios are located on South Eleventh Street in Beaumont and its transmitter is located in Vidor, Texas.

Ratings and Popularity
The Beaumont/Port Arthur Radio market is the #133 radio market in size according to the  Arbitron rating service.  As of Fall 2006, KQXY-FM was the 2nd highest rated station with a 9.3% share of the 15+ market, behind sister Urban station KTCX's 17.0% market share in the Beaumont/Port Arthur DMA.

History
KQXY signed on the air as a licensed Class C FM broadcast facility, with the call sign KLVI-FM on January 3, 1967, with an ERP of 59 kilowatts, from a HAAT of 230 meters, and as the FM sister to KLVI. The facility was originally proposed by and licensed to John H. Hicks, Jr. & Madelyn O. Hicks.

The callsign of KLVI-FM would quickly be changed in September 1967 to KBPO to reflect the three major communities served of Beaumont, Port Arthur, and Orange.

On September 15, 1976, the station would become the current KQXY as "The Beautiful Q", the Golden Triangle's easy listening radio station. Towards the late 1980s, it moved toward mainstream adult contemporary as "Y94". During the majority of the 1990s, the station identified simply as "94.1 KQXY" playing an "80s, 90s, and now" format before seguing to CHR direction in the early 2000s.

By 2007, "Q94" returned to a Hot AC direction, although the station still reports as a CHR to some radio industry trades. Later in the year, "Q94" began broadcasting online, as have other Cumulus owned radio stations.

External links
Q94 Website

QXY-FM
Contemporary hit radio stations in the United States
Cumulus Media radio stations